Dharamgarh Women's College is a college affiliated to Kalahandi University.

History
The college was established in 1996 and has been notified as an aided educational institution since 2012 by the Govt. of Odisha, Department of Higher Education.

Department
This college began with a strength of 64 students in Arts and three optional subjects: History, Political Science and Education along with compulsory subject: English and M.I.L.(Odia). New optional subject in Home Science and honours in History was added since 2006–07.

Incident
Recently (2019) there was an incident where a girl of this college was under acid attack.

See also

References

External links 
Sambalpur University Website

Department of Higher Education, Odisha
Universities and colleges in Odisha
Kalahandi district
Colleges_affiliated_to_Sambalpur_University
1996 establishments in Orissa
Educational institutions established in 1996